The Newton River is a river in Fiordland, New Zealand. It drains Lake Fraser south-westward into the Tasman Sea just south of West Cape.

Newton River is an official name, gazetted on 4 February 1960, after being in use by local fishermen for some time.

The river flows over the Newton River pluton of Carbonferous biotite, granodiorite and granite, which has been glaciated and also forms a rock arch to the south of the river mouth.

The beech forest in the valley includes black beech (tawairauriki), kāmahi, and silver beech (tawhai).

See also
List of rivers of New Zealand

References

Rivers of Fiordland